John Joseph McMahon (December 3, 1928 – June 11, 1989) was an American professional basketball player and coach. A 6'1" guard from St. John's University, McMahon was selected by the Rochester Royals in the 1952 NBA draft. He played eight seasons in the National Basketball Association (NBA), for Rochester and the St. Louis Hawks.

McMahon became a successful coach in the American Basketball League, the NBA and the American Basketball Association (ABA), with eleven seasons as a head coach in the three leagues. His first coaching stint was with the Kansas City Steers of the ABL (1961–62 season). The following season, he began coaching in the NBA with the Chicago Zephyrs in the 1962–63 season. He would also coach the Cincinnati Royals, the San Diego Rockets, and the ABA's Pittsburgh Condors.

References

External links
 BasketballReference: Jack McMahon (as player)
 BasketballReference: Jack McMahon (as coach)

1928 births
1989 deaths
American Basketball League (1961–62) coaches
American men's basketball coaches
American men's basketball players
Basketball coaches from New York (state)
Basketball players from New York City
Chicago Zephyrs head coaches
Cincinnati Royals head coaches
Philadelphia 76ers assistant coaches
Pittsburgh Condors coaches
Point guards
Rochester Royals draft picks
Rochester Royals players
San Diego Rockets head coaches
Shooting guards
Sportspeople from Brooklyn
St. John's Red Storm men's basketball players
St. Louis Hawks players